Francesco Armellini Pantalassi de' Medici  (13 July 1470 – 8 January 1528) was a cardinal of the Roman Catholic Church. He was a member of the Roman Curia.

Life
Medici was born in Perugia, Umbria. He was made a cardinal on the 6 July 1517 by Pope Leo X, to the titular church of San Callisto. This was his fifth consistory. He was bishop of Gerace e Oppido in 1517, and archbishop of Taranto in 1525. He was bishop of Gallipoli.

In the rione Borgo the cardinal let built a magnificent palace bearing his name.

The historian Paolo Giovio wrote that the exactions and greed that the Cardinal showed in running the papal finances, as Camerlengo of the Holy Roman Church from 1521, had played a large part in causing the 1527 sack of Rome, because he had alienated the Roman population.

External links 
 Biography

References 

1470 births
1528 deaths
People from Perugia
16th-century Italian cardinals
Cardinal-nephews
Camerlengos of the Holy Roman Church
16th-century Italian Roman Catholic bishops